"How Country Feels" is a song written by Vicky McGehee, Wendell Mobley, and Neil Thrasher and recorded by American country music artist Randy Houser. It was released in May 2012 as the first single and title track from Houser's album  of the same name. The song would become semi-famous for being the first song on a majority of stations nationwide joining Cumulus Media's "Nash FM" format, starting with WNSH in New York in January 2013; as a fitting bookend, when the format signed off the station in October 2021, station DJ Kelly Ford, the first under the format, would use it to sign off the station's live farewell show.

Critical reception
Billy Dukes of Taste of Country gave the song three and a half stars out of five, writing that "the lyrics are sharp but familiar, and there isn’t a whole lot of attitude until a guitar solo late in the song." Matt Bjorke of Roughstock gave the song a favorable review, calling it "a strong, melodic single that is immediate and hook-filled and sung perfectly."

Commercial performance
"How Country Feels" debuted at number 55 on the U.S. Billboard Hot Country Songs chart for the week of May 12, 2012. It debuted at number 81 on the U.S. Billboard Hot 100 chart for the week of November 21, 2012. It debuted at number 55 on the Canadian Hot 100 chart for the week of December 15, 2012. On the Country Airplay chart dated February 2, 2013, "How Country Feels" became Houser's first Number One country hit.  The song has sold over a million copies in the US as of March 2015.

Music video
The music video was filmed at Glen Leven Farm in Nashville, Tennessee. It was directed by Wes Edwards and premiered on August 31, 2012.

The video starts off in an office building. A typical female office worker in her cubicle chats with her friend online. The friend ask if she is able to hangout with her and their other friends in the country, but she can't because she is working during the weekend. Her friend sends her a music link, the same song. When she clicks on it she takes off her glasses and enters a daydream of her in the countryside.

She wonders around in the field and accepts a ride with a nice young man with a pick up truck. He takes her to a country cottage with many of his friends are hanging out. As the video progresses, the female worker begins to ditch her work heels in favor for country boots and starts enjoying the fun of being out in the country. Nearing the end Randy Houser is seen as entertainment for the people at the cottage, which is also where he and his group are playing in during the video. As she leans to kiss the young who picked her up, she wakes up in her cubicle thinking it was a dream. But seeing she is still where her boots makes her suggest otherwise.

Charts and certifications

Album

Year-end charts

Certifications

References

2012 singles
Randy Houser songs
BBR Music Group singles
Songs written by Neil Thrasher
Music videos directed by Wes Edwards
Songs written by Wendell Mobley
Songs written by Vicky McGehee
2012 songs